Harts may refer to:

 Harts (surname)
 Harts (musician), Melbourne indie musician
 Harts, West Virginia, United States
 Harts Stores, a regional general merchandise chain in the midwestern United States
 Hong Kong Amateur Radio Transmitting Society

See also

 Arts
 Hart (disambiguation)
 Harts Bluff
 Harts Hill
 Harts Range
 Harts River
 Hearts (disambiguation)